Dovhenke may refer to:

 , a village in the Cherkasy Oblast in Ukraine
 , a village in the Dvorichna Raion, in the Kharkiv Oblast in Ukraine
 Dovhenke, Izium Raion, Kharkiv Oblast, a village in the Izium Raion, in the Kharkiv Oblast in Ukraine
 , a village in the Velykyi Burluk Raion, in the Kharkiv Oblast in Ukraine